The Spirit Room is the major-label debut studio album by American singer-songwriter Michelle Branch, released by the Maverick Recording Company and Warner Bros. Records in the United States on August 14, 2001. The album was recorded at Sunset Sound, Henson Recording Studios and Ananda Studios in Hollywood, California and mastered by Stephen Marcussen at Marcussen Mastering in Los Angeles, California.

Background
The album's title comes from the name of a bar in Jerome, Arizona, near Branch's hometown of Sedona.

Artwork
The album cover was shot in an industrial area across from an electrical substation in Los Angeles, California alongside the Los Angeles River facing north-west at the skyline during sunset.

20th anniversary edition
Branch decided to celebrate its anniversary by re-recording the album and pressing it on vinyl for the first time. On September 10, 2021, Branch performed the album in its entirety during a special virtual concert. An afterparty and Q&A session followed. It was released on October 15, 2021.

Commercial performance
The Spirit Room debuted at number 28 on the US Billboard 200, selling 68,000 copies in its first week. Although, it had commercial success in the US, the album spent a total of 86 weeks on the US Billboard 200 chart, making it Branch's longest charting album in the US. As of July 2003, the album has sold 1.8 million copies in the US. On August 19, 2011, the album was certified double platinum by the Recording Industry Association of America (RIAA) for shipments of over two million copies in the United States. Worldwide, The Spirit Room had sold 3 million copies worldwide, It was Branch's best selling album to date.

In Canada, although the album did not appear on the chart the album was certified gold, selling 50,000 copies in October 2003. In Australia, it was also certified gold with shipments of 35,000.

Track listing

Singles
"Everywhere" – July 17, 2001
"All You Wanted" – October 28, 2001 
"Goodbye to You" – September 9, 2002

Personnel

Musicians
Michelle Branch – guitar, keyboards, vocals
Kenny Aronoff – drums
Vinnie Colaiuta – drums
John Shanks – bass guitar, guitar, keyboards
Patrick Warren – keyboards

Production
Producers: John Shanks, Jeremy Welt
Engineers: Marc DeSisto, Lars Fox
Assistant engineers: Steve Kaplan, Tom Nellen, Chris Reynolds, Jason Schweitzer
Mixing: Marc DeSisto, Chris Lord-Alge, Dave Way
Mastering: Stephen Marcussen
Pro-Tools: Lars Fox
Programming: Lars Fox, John Shanks
Production coordination: Shari Sutcliffe
Art direction: Kim Biggs, David Harlan
Photography: Matthew Welch

Use in media
 "Goodbye to You" was performed live by Michelle Branch on the season 6 episode "Tabula Rasa" of Buffy the Vampire Slayer.
 "Goodbye to You" was also performed live on the season 5 episode "Centennial Charmed" of Charmed.
 "You Get Me" became the theme song for the MTV reality series Sorority Life.
 "You Get Me" is featured in the films What a Girl Wants, The Hot Chick, and Van Wilder.
 "You Set Me Free" was featured in the following films:
 The trailer of DreamWorks Animation's Spirit: Stallion of the Cimarron.
 Towards the closing credits of the 2003 film Just Married.
 In the 2005 film Ice Princess, and it is featured on the movie's soundtrack.
 "Everywhere" is featured in the 2001 film American Pie 2 and is on the film's soundtrack.

Charts

Weekly charts

Year-end charts

Certifications

References

2001 debut albums
Michelle Branch albums
Albums produced by John Shanks
Maverick Records albums
Reprise Records albums
Warner Records albums